Géza Turi (born 11 March 1974, in Budapest) is a Hungarian football player who currently plays for KÍ Klaksvík. Whilst at Hungarian side ZTE he played against Manchester United at Old Trafford in a UEFA Champions League qualifier. He came on as a substitute after Saša Ilić was sent off for a foul on Ruud van Nistelrooy. He came to the Faroe Islands to be a goalkeeper for GÍ Gøta, which merged with LÍF Leirvík in 2009 into the new club Víkingur. Géza Turi has been the goal keeper for Víkingur Gøta and the former GÍ Gøta since 2006. He has earlier been a goalkeeper for various football clubs in Hungary.

References

External links 
 
Hivatasos Labdarugok Szervezete
European Football Clubs & Squads
Vikingur.fo, the Official Website of Víkingur Gøta.
Géza Túri's profile on FaroeSoccer.com

1974 births
Living people
Footballers from Budapest
Hungarian footballers
Expatriate footballers in the Faroe Islands
Csepel SC footballers
Zalaegerszegi TE players
Fehérvár FC players
FC Tatabánya players
Víkingur Gøta players
Association football goalkeepers